Masters of Chant is the first album of the second incarnation of Gregorian and second overall under the Gregorian name, released in 1999. It is the first in the Masters of Chant series of albums.

In 2008, Barnes & Noble/Curb Records released a Gregorian compilation album with the Masters of Chant name, containing tracks from various Masters of Chant albums.

Track listing

Charts

Weekly charts

Year-end charts

Certifications

References 

1999 albums
Covers albums
Gregorian (band) albums